The FHJ-84 is an over/under twin-barreled 62 mm incendiary rocket launcher developed by Norinco for the People's Liberation Army. Type 84 features two tubes that can be loaded with 62mm incendiary and smoke rockets. The FHJ-84 is China's attempt to develop an alternative to World War II era flamethrowers.

Variants
FHJ-84 Original variant.
FHJ-01 Improved variant with new type of incendiary ammunition and a better day sight.
FHJ-02 7-tube 62mm remote-controlled multiple launch rocket system.

Operators
 : People's Liberation Army

See also
 DP-64 Nepryadva - outwardly similar looking Russian weapon
 M202A1 FLASH
 RPO-A Shmel (Bumblebee)

References

External links
   - Review with many pictures

Cold War weapons of China
Incendiary weapons
Rocket weapons
Weapons of the People's Republic of China
Military equipment introduced in the 1980s